Stuart R. Hagmann (born in Sturgeon Bay, Wisconsin on September 2, 1942) is a television and film director primarily active from 1968 to 1977.

His television work includes episodes of the series Mission: Impossible and Mannix. In film he is noted for directing The Strawberry Statement (1970), which was co-winner of the Cannes Film Festival's Jury Prize.

References

External links

American television directors
People from Sturgeon Bay, Wisconsin
1942 births
Living people
Film directors from Wisconsin